The  is a 9.3 km long commuter rail line in Hyōgo Prefecture, Japan owned and operated by the private railway operator Hankyu Railway. It is the longest of three branchlines of the Hankyu Kobe Line. The line connects the cities of Nishinomiya and Takarazuka.

Operation
The Imazu Line runs between Imazu Station and Takarazuka Station. However, no trains run directly from one end to the other because the tracks have split since 1984 at Nishinomiya-Kitaguchi Station, where the line crosses the Kobe Line. Typical Imazu Line trains stop every station between Imazu and Nishinomiya-Kitaguchi (south section) or Nishinomiya-Kitaguchi and Takarazuka (north section).

A small number of trains, called Semi-Express (junkyū), run from Takarazuka Station to Umeda Station (Hankyu's main terminal in Osaka) on weekdays not via the Takarazuka Line, but via the Imazu Line and the Kobe Line. Semi-Express trains of this route do not stop at Nishinomiya-Kitaguchi Station because of the layout of the track in the station; there is no platform for through trains. The distance between Takarazuka and Umeda stations via the Imazu Line is shorter than the route via the Takarazuka line.

Stations
All stations are in Hyōgo Prefecture
Stops:
S: Semi-Express
E: Express (Rinji-Kyūkō)
Pass: |

Connections
 Hanshin Main Line at Imazu
 Hankyu Kobe Line at Nishinomiya-Kitaguchi
 Hankyu Takarazuka Line at Takarazuka
 Fukuchiyama Line at Takarazuka

History
The section from Nishinomiya-Kitaguchi to Imazu opened on 18 December 1926, and the line was renamed the Imazu Line.

Attractions along the line
 Hanshin Racecourse near Nigawa Station
 Kwansei Gakuin University near Kotoen Station

Culture
Hankyū Densha

References

Imazu Line
Rail transport in Hyōgo Prefecture
Standard gauge railways in Japan
Railway lines opened in 1926